The European Union Computer Programs Directive controls the legal protection of computer programs under the copyright law of the European Union. It was issued under the internal market provisions of the Treaty of Rome.  The most recent version is Directive 2009/24/EC.

History 
In Europe, the need to foster the computer software industry brought attention to the lack of adequate harmonisation among the copyright laws of the various EU nations with respect to such software.  Economic pressure spurred the development of the first directive which had two goals (1) the harmonisation of the law and (2) dealing with the problems caused by the need for interoperability.

The first EU Directive on the legal protection of computer programs was Council Directive 91/250/EEC of 14 May 1991.  It required (Art. 1) that computer programs and any associated design material be protected under copyright as literary works within the sense of the Berne Convention for the Protection of Literary and Artistic Works.

The Directive also defined the copyright protection to be applied to computer programs: the owner of the copyright has the exclusive right to authorise (Art 4):

 the temporary or permanent copying of the program, including any copying which may be necessary to load, view or run the program;
 the translation, adaptation or other alteration to the program;
 the distribution of the program to the public by any means, including rental, subject to the first-sale doctrine.

However, these rights are subject to certain limitations (Art. 5). The legal owner of a program is assumed to have a licence to create any copies necessary to use the program and to alter the program within its intended purpose (e.g. for error correction). The legal owner may also make a back-up copy for his or her personal use. The program may also be decompiled if this is necessary to ensure it operates with another program or device (Art. 6), but the results of the decompilation may not be used for any other purpose without infringing the copyright in the program.

The duration of the copyright was originally fixed at the life of the author plus fifty years (Art. 8), in accordance with the Berne Convention standard for literary works (Art. 7.1 Berne Convention). This has since been prolonged to the life of the author plus seventy years by the 1993 Copyright Duration Directive (superseded but confirmed by the 2006 Copyright Term Directive).

Council Directive 91/250/EEC was formally replaced by Directive 2009/24/EC on 25 May 2009, which consolidated "the various minor amendments the original directive had received over the years".

Implementation

See also 
 Copyright law of the European Union
 Software copyright

References

External links 
 Text of the original directive on the legal protection of computer programs (no longer in force)
 Consolidated version of the directive (1993-11-19) no longer in force
 Report from the Commission to the Council, the European Parliament and the Economic and Social Committee on the implementation and effects of directive 91/250/EEC on the legal protection of computer programs, (2000-04-10)
 Directive 2009/24/EC of the European Parliament and of the Council of 23 April 2009 on the legal protection of computer programs current directive, in force

Copyright law of the European Union
European Union directives
Copyright legislation
1991 in law
1991 in the European Economic Community